Vanguard High School is one of seven public high schools in Marion County, Florida. The school serves the northeast area of Ocala, Florida. Vanguard offers the International Baccalaureate program, which accepts students from across Marion County and from surrounding counties and accounts for approximately 25% of the student population. In addition to the IB Program, Vanguard High School is the home of the Future Educators Academy. Graduates of the Future Educators Academy have the opportunity to dual enroll and complete their AA degree upon high school graduation.

Vanguard's mascot is a knight and the school colors are red, white, and blue. Notable alumni include NFL football player Daunte Culpepper and Dustin Moskovitz, co-founder of Facebook. The Vanguard Knight's cross-town rivals are the Forest High School Wildcats. Raney's Inc., Siva MD PA and AdventHealth are the school's business partners.

The student population as of the 2021-2022 school year is 1,600 students. The school is staffed by 120 people.

IB Program 
In 1996, Vanguard began involvement with the International Baccalaureate (IB) Diploma Programme. Vanguard is currently recognized as an IB World School. Vanguard was the 26th High School in the State of Florida, and currently one of only two schools in Marion County, along with Lake Weir High School, to offer this curriculum.

Students accepted into the program take advanced classes for their Freshman and Sophomore years, which prepare them for the actual IB courses taken in Junior and Senior years. Students can be accepted into the program as ninth or tenth graders, but eleventh and twelfth graders can only transfer in from another IB school. The first two years are termed as Pre-IB and consist of a combination of Advanced Placement, Pre-IB or Honors courses designed to prepare students for the actual IB courses and exams.

Integration 
Vanguard was the first integrated school in Marion County.

Notable alumni 
 P. J. Williams – Cornerback for the New Orleans Saints in the NFL 
 Kenny Clark – Former wide receiver for the Minnesota Vikings in the NFL
 Daunte Culpepper – Former quarterback for the Minnesota Vikings, Miami Dolphins and Detroit Lions in the NFL
 Drayton Florence – Former cornerback for the Buffalo Bills in the NFL
 Travis Mays – Former NBA basketball player
 Carlos Eduardo Mendoza - Federal Judge
 Dustin Moskovitz - Co-founder of the social networking site Facebook.
 Michael James Shaw – Actor, plays Papa Midnight in Constantine
 Natrell Jamerson - Former football player for the Green Bay Packers in the NFL
 Tyree Gillespie - Current NFL football player for the Las Vegas Raiders in the NFL

See also 
 International Baccalaureate
 IB Diploma Programme
 National Merit Scholarship Program

Notes 
 Notably the Vanguard High School class of 2005 still holds the record among all the county schools for the most eligible graduates in the history of the Marion County Public school systems records.

References 

 2006-2007 Vanguard High School Year Book

Buildings and structures in Ocala, Florida
High schools in Marion County, Florida
Public high schools in Florida
Educational institutions established in 1969
1969 establishments in Florida